Macho Uno  (foaled April 24, 1998 in Kentucky) is an American Thoroughbred racehorse. He was sired by the 1994 American Horse of the Year and U.S. Racing Hall of Fame inductee, Holy Bull.

Trained by Joe Orseno, Macho Uno is best known for narrowly winning the 2000 Breeders' Cup Juvenile over future three-year-old champion Point Given and being voted the Eclipse Award as the American Champion Two-Year-Old Colt.

His three-year-old campaign was delayed until July resulting in limited starts though he did capture the Pennsylvania Derby and finish a creditable fourth to Tiznow in the Breeders' Cup Classic. At four he won an allowance race and the grade ii Massachusetts Handicap before closing out his career with a fifth place finish in the 2002 Breeders Cup Classic behind Volponi.

Retired to stud duty, Macho Uno stands at his owner's Adena Springs South in Ocala, Florida. He is the sire of graded stakes winners Harlem Rocker, Macho Again, Mucho Macho Man, and Wicked Style.

References
 Macho Uno's pedigree and partial racing stats
 Macho Uno at Adena Springs
 
 

1998 racehorse births
Racehorses bred in Kentucky
Racehorses trained in the United States
Breeders' Cup Juvenile winners
Eclipse Award winners
Thoroughbred family 1-c